New York Institute of Technology was founded in 1955 and has graduated more than 103,000 alumni, as of 2019. The following is a list of some notable alumni.

Academia
Kyriacos A. Athanasiou, Chair of the Biomedical Engineering department at University of California, Davis.
Ken Pugh, professor in the Department of Pediatrics at Yale School of Medicine.
Jill Wruble, professor at Yale School of Medicine.
Xiaolin (Larry) Qiu, Chairman of the Board and President of Nanchang Institute of Technology.

Deans
Shenglai Chen, Dean, School of Literature, Shanghai Academy of Social Sciences 
Bernice Pass-Stern, Assistant Dean, Phillips Beth Israel School of Nursing. 
Charles H. Pryor II, Dean, LIM College. 
Thomas A. Scandalis, Dean of Pacific Northwest University of Health Sciences.
Jeannie Liakaris, Assistant Dean at New York University.

Arts, journalism and entertainment

 Isobella Jade, writer
 Antonio Meneses Saillant, writer
 Nada Shabout, art historian
 Seiko Mikami, artist
 Carrie Moyer, painter and writer
 Jake Sasseville, television host, producer, writer, director and author
 Lori Bizzoco, writer, journalist, former public relations executive and the founder and executive editor of CupidsPulse.com
 Patti Ann Browne, TV News Anchor, Fox News
 Rik Cordero, music video, commercial, and film director
 Jim Geoghan, Emmy-nominated executive producer of The Disney Channel's The Suite Life on Deck and the original The Suite Life of Zack and Cody, among others.
 Brian Kenny, ESPN SportsCenter Anchor
 Art Klein, producer known for Bottle Shock, Nobel Son and Marilyn Hotchkiss' Ballroom Dancing & Charm School, among others.
 Jonathan Monaghan, visual artist and animator
 Jill Nicolini, traffic reporter for "The PIX Morning News" in New York
 Candice Night, Lead singer, Blackmore's Night
 Adam Pascal, actor, singer, and producer (most notable as Roger Davis in the Broadway musical Rent)
 The Tanster, street artist
Sam Ryan, sportscaster
 Jenni Farley, American television personality.
 Ben Finley, broadcast journalist, Editorial Producer with Anderson Cooper 360. He was a Producer for “In the Life” on PBS and has produced for several CNN and MSNBC programs and specials, including Presidential debates, and the wedding of William & Kate. He earned an Emmy Award and four Peabody awards.
 Alphan Eşeli, Turkish Director, Screenwriter and Photographer
 Kimmi Kappenberg, contestant from Survivor: The Australian Outback and Survivor: Cambodia.
 Doug Draizin, film producer
 Rahul Dholakia, Indian film director-producer-screenwriter
 Vithaya Pansringarm, Thai actor
 Chris Distefano, comedian and TV host
 Chih-Yuan Tai, actor, known for Guang yin de gu shi (2008), Sao ren (2012) and Bao qing tian (1993), among others.
 Ameera Al-Kooheji, Bahraini TV presenter, video producer
 Rob Cabitto, American author, business owner, and public speaker.
 Joji (musician)
 Jamila Rowser, American writer and publisher.

Business

 Richard J. Daly, CEO, Broadridge Financial Solutions
 Daisy Exposito-Ulla, former CEO, The Bravo Group Young & Rubicam
 Monte N. Redman, CEO, Astoria Financial Corporation and Astoria Federal Savings & Loan Association
 Perry J. Kaufman, American systematic trader, index developer, and quantitative financial theorist.
 Robert E. Evanson, President (retired), McGraw-Hill.
 James Chip Cleary, president and chief executive of the International Association of Amusement Parks and Attractions.  
 Eli Wachtel, Managing Director, Bear Stearns.
Itzhak Fisher, Vice President, Nielsen Holdings. He also founded and served as CEO of RSL Communications, a $1.5-billion telecommunications company.
Vincent L. Sadusky, former President and CEO of LIN Media, current Chief Executive Officer at Univision Communications Inc. 
Iman Mutlaq, Jordanian entrepreneur
 Chen Ningning, founder and president of Pioneer Metals Holdings Co., Ltd. She is a self-made billionaire, her net worth is $1.8 billion as of 2011.
 Yaron Varsano, a well-known multimillionaire Israeli real estate developer and the husband of Wonder Woman actress Gal Gadot.

Government

 Thani Ahmed Alzeyoudi, Minister of Climate Change and Environment for the United Arab Emirates
 Craig D. Button, US Air Force pilot noted for his mysterious flight and crash
 Humayun Chaudhry, physician and CEO, Federation of State Medical Boards
 Joseph Saladino, New York state assemblyman, 12th district
 Anthony Seminerio, politician
 Andre Pierre, former Democratic mayor of North Miami, Florida and an attorney
 Nicholas Estavillo, NYPD Chief of Patrol
 Rafael Piñeiro, First Deputy Commissioner of the New York City Police Department (NYPD)
 Brian M. McLaughlin, New York state assemblyman
 Jill Wruble, retired from the United States Army with rank of major.
 Fang Wong, retired officer of the United States Army who served as the National Commander of The American Legion. Bronze Star Medal recipient.
 Karine Jean-Pierre, Deputy White House Press Secretary, American political campaign organizer, activist, political commentator, author, and lecturer in international and public affairs at Columbia University.

Royalty
 Queen Sylvia of Buganda
 Won, Hereditary Prince Imperial of Korea, contested Head of the Korean Imperial Household

Science and related fields

 Zhang Enhe, scientist, chief engineer of the Xian Y-7
 Richard Jadick, naval surgeon credited for saving the lives of 30 marines and sailors during the Second Battle of Fallujah, earning him the Bronze Star.
 Steven Wolk, chief technology officer, P. C. Richard & Son
 Max Mermelstein, drug smuggler, worked as chief engineer for the Sheraton Hotel.
 Vincent Connare, font designer and former Microsoft employee. Amongst his creations are the Comic Sans font, and the Trebuchet MS font
Philip Fasano, executive vice president and chief information officer at American International Group (AIG)
Patri Friedman, Software Engineer at Google.
Joseph Fuller, AIA, NCARB, a New York area architect specializing in Educational Architecture and Historic Preservation.   He is best known for his firm’s designs for the 2009 Academy of Information Technology & Engineering in Stamford, CT, the 2010 restoration and expansion of Old Town Hall (Stamford, Connecticut), the expansion of Staples High School (Connecticut), and the restoration of the Gothic facades and campus of City College of New York.
Ray Rayburn, Fellow of Audio Engineering Society, audio systems engineer, digital audio designer for U.S. Senate.
Mikhail Varshavski, American doctor, social media personality and philanthropist. People magazine named him the "Sexiest Doctor Alive" in its Sexiest Men Alive issue. 
Ben Wolo, Director of engineering and operation at Qwest, Managing Director of LIBTELCO

Sports
NYIT produced several Olympians. NYIT's track and field program alone produced five Olympians.

 Allison Baver, Olympic Speed Skating Medalist (Bronze, 2010)
 Don Cooper, head pitching coach, Chicago White Sox
 Jim Ferry, basketball coach
 Sarah Fisher, race car driver
 Joe Vasold, lacrosse player 
 Ray Giannelli, baseball player
 Manix Auriantal, professional basketball player
 Chris Algieri, professional boxer in the Light Welterweight division
 Allen Watson, former Major League Baseball pitcher (member of 2000 World Series Champion New York Yankees)
 Brian Brady, former right fielder in Major League Baseball who played for the California Angels
 Patrick Jarrett, represented Jamaica at the 2000 and 2004 Summer Olympics. 
 Howard Burnett, a one-time Olympian, making his only appearance in 1988 (Seoul, South Korea), when he won the silver medal.  
 Paston Coke, won the silver medal in the 400 metres at 1999 World Student Games in personal record of 45.15 seconds.
 Rade Džambić, Serbian former professional basketball player who last played for ZTE KK.

References

External links
NYIT Magazine — News about alumni and NYIT
Profiles Gallery

New York Institute of Technology
New York Institute of Technology
New York Institute of Technology alumni